Peddabrahmadevam is an Indian Railways station in Peddabrahmadevam, a village in East Godavari district of Andhra Pradesh. It lies on the Visakhapatnam–Vijayawada section and is administered under Vijayawada railway division of South Central Railway zone. Six trains halt in this station every day.

History
The southern part of the East Coast State Railway (from Waltair to Vijayawada) was taken over by Madras Railway in 1901.

References

External links 

Railway stations in East Godavari district
Vijayawada railway division